Chimarra altmani is a species of fingernet caddisfly in the family Philopotamidae. It is found in Middle America, most commonly in Panama.

References

Trichoptera
Insects described in 1998